Dada, or Dadaism, was an early 20th century art movement

Dada may also refer to:

Film
 Dada (1979 film), a Hindi film starring Vinod Mehra and Bindiya Goswami
 Dada (2000 film), a Hindi film starring Mithun Chakraborty
 Dada (2023 film), an Indian Tamil-language film 
 Dádá, original Chinese title of Dada's Dance, a 2008 film directed by Zhang Yuan
 Division of Animation and Digital Arts, University of Southern California School of Cinematic Arts

Music
 Dada (band), a three piece rock band formed in Los Angeles
 Dada (Dada album), their 1998 album
 Dada, a band that evolved into Vinegar Joe, and their 1970 album Dada
 DaDa, a 1983 album by Alice Cooper
 DaDa, a 2011 album by Polish band Blue Café
 "Dada" (song), a 2011 single by Japanese rock band Radwimps

People
 Idi Amin, Idi Amin Dada (c. 1925–2003), former president of Uganda
 Dada Dharmadhikari (1899–1985), Indian freedom fighter and social reformer
 Dadá Maravilha,  Dario José dos Santos (born 1943), Brazilian retired footballer
 Sourav Ganguly (born 1972), known as Dada, former Indian cricketer
 Dada Amir Haider Khan (c. 1900–1989), communist activist and revolutionary in India and Pakistan
 Isabel Dada (1941–2017), Salvadoran actress
 Maqbool Dada, American academic
 Sant Mekan Dada (1667–1730), a Kapdi saint from India
 Nayyar Ali Dada (born 1943), Pakistani architect
 Matt Schwartz (born 1971), also known as DADA, musician

Other uses
 Dada, a Yoruba child with natural dreadlocks of hair, known as an oruko amutorunwa
 Dada, Dursunbey, a village in Turkey

See also

 Da Da Da (disambiguation)
 Data (disambiguation)
 Daada, a 1988 Indian Kannada film 
 Dadha, a 1994 Malayalam film
 Pandurang Shastri Athavale (1920–2003), Indian activist and philosopher, also known as Dadaji
 Father in many languages; see Mama and papa